Zygosepalum labiosum is an epiphytic orchid found in South America, growing in dense shade at up to  in elevation.

Description

Zygosepalum labiosum has scandent rhizomes with ovoid pseudobulbs. The lip is white with a violet callus and violet veins.

References

Orchids of South America
Zygopetalinae